Sybropis frontalis is a species of beetle in the family Cerambycidae, and the only species in the genus Sybropis. It was described by Pascoe in 1885.

References

Pteropliini
Beetles described in 1885